The 2018 Mountain West Conference baseball tournament took place from May 24 through 27. Nevada, San Diego State, San José State, and UNLV met in the double-elimination tournament held at Tony Gwynn Stadium in San Diego, California. San Diego State earned the Mountain West Conference's automatic bid to the 2018 NCAA Division I baseball tournament.

Format and seeding
The conference's top four teams will be seeded based on winning percentage during the round robin regular season schedule.  They will then play a double-elimination tournament with the top seed playing the fourth seeded team and the second seeded team playing the third seed.

Bracket

Schedule

References

Tournament
Mountain West Conference baseball tournament
Mountain West Conference baseball tournament
Mountain West Conference baseball tournament
Baseball competitions in San Diego
College baseball tournaments in California